The 2022 United States House of Representatives elections in Indiana were held on November 8, 2022, to elect the nine U.S. representatives from the state of Indiana, one from each of the state's nine congressional districts. The elections coincided with other elections to the U.S. House of Representatives, elections to the U.S. Senate, and various state and local elections. Primary elections took place on May 3.

District 1 
{{Infobox election
| election_name = 2022 Indiana's 1st congressional district election
| country = Indiana
| type = presidential
| ongoing = no
| previous_election = 2020 United States House of Representatives elections in Indiana#District 1
| previous_year = 2020
| election_date = 
| next_election = 2024 United States House of Representatives elections in Indiana#District 1
| next_year = 2024
| image_size = x150px
| image1 = Frank Mrvan 117th U.S Congress (alt crop).jpg
| nominee1 = Frank J. Mrvan
| party1 = Democratic Party (United States)
| popular_vote1 = 112,656
| percentage1 = 52.8%
| image2 = File:3x4.svg
| nominee2 = Jennifer-Ruth Green
| party2 = Republican Party (United States)
| popular_vote2 = 100,542
| percentage2 = 47.2%
| map_image = 2022 United States House of Representatives Election in Indiana's 1st Congressional District.svg
| map_size = 200px
| map_caption = County Results  Mrvan:   Green:' 
| title = U.S. Representative
| before_election = Frank J. Mrvan
| before_party = Democratic Party (United States)
| after_election = Frank J. Mrvan
| after_party = Democratic Party (United States)
}}

The 1st district encompasses Northwest Indiana, taking in the eastern Chicago metropolitan area, including Hammond and Gary, as well as Lake County, Porter County and western LaPorte County. The incumbent is Democrat Frank J. Mrvan, who was elected with 56.6% of the vote in 2020.

During the campaign, a research firm contracted by the Democratic Congressional Campaign Committee inappropriately obtained the military records of candidate and air force veteran Jennifer-Ruth Green. This included her experience of having been sexually assaulted by an Iraqi serviceman. Green stated she was "saddened to have to share publicly one of the most private events of my life".

Democratic primary
Candidates
Nominee
Frank J. Mrvan, incumbent U.S. representative

Eliminated in primary
Richard Fantin

Endorsements

Results

Republican primary
Candidates
Nominee
Jennifer-Ruth Green, Air Force veteran and educator

Eliminated in primary
Mark Leyva, former steel mill worker and perennial candidate
Martin Lucas, attorney
Blair Milo, former mayor of La Porte
Nicholas Pappas, attorney
Ben Ruiz
Aaron Storer

Endorsements

Results

 General election 
 Predictions 

Endorsements

Polling

 Results 

 District 2 

The 2nd district is located in north central Indiana taking in Michiana, including South Bend, Mishawaka, and Elkhart. The incumbent was Republican Jackie Walorski, who was re-elected with 61.5% of the vote in 2020. Walorski was killed in a car crash on August 3, 2022, which also killed two members of her staff, Emma Thomson and Zach Potts. In accordance with Indiana law, a special election is set to be held in order to fill the vacancy. This election was under the new district lines as the congressional district boundaries set in the 2020 redistricting cycle will go into effect on January 3, 2023, while the special election was conducted under the old district lines.

Republican primary
Candidates
Nominee
Jackie Walorski, incumbent U.S. representative

Endorsements

Results

Democratic primary
Candidates
Nominee
Paul Steury, environmental consultant

Endorsements

Results

 General election 
Predictions

 Results 

District 3

The 3rd district is based in northeastern Indiana, taking in Fort Wayne and the surrounding areas. The incumbent is Republican Jim Banks, who was re-elected with 67.8% of the vote in 2020.

Republican primary
Candidates
Nominee
 Jim Banks, incumbent U.S. representative and Chair of the Republican Study Committee

Endorsements

Results

Democratic primary
Candidates
Nominee
 Gary Snyder, businessman

Eliminated in primary
 Phillip Beachy
 A. J. Calkins

Removed from ballot
 Tommy Schrader

Endorsements

Results

General election
Predictions

Results

District 4

The 4th district is located in west-central Indiana taking in Lafayette and the western suburbs of Indianapolis. The incumbent is Republican Jim Baird, who was elected with 66.6% of the vote in 2020.

Republican primary
Candidates
Nominee
 Jim Baird, incumbent U.S. representative

Removed from ballot
 T. Charles Bookwalter

Endorsements

Results

Democratic primary
Candidates
Nominee
 Roger Day, businessman

Eliminated in primary
 Howard Pollchik

Results

General election
Predictions

Results

District 5

The 5th district previously encompassed northern Indianapolis and its eastern and northern suburbs, including Marion, Carmel, Anderson, Noblesville, Fishers, Kokomo, and Muncie. Its boundaries were significantly redrawn in 2021 by the Republican legislature to make it less competitive, removing it from Indianapolis entirely while extending it farther north and east into more rural areas. The incumbent was Republican Victoria Spartz, who was elected with 50.0% of the vote in 2020.

Republican primary
Candidates
Nominee
Victoria Spartz, incumbent U.S. representative

Endorsements

Results

Democratic primary
Candidates
Nominee
 Jeanine Lee Lake, journalist and nominee for Indiana's 6th congressional district in 2018 and 2020

Eliminated in primary
 Matthew Hall, former Lawrence city council member

Withdrew
 Melanie Wright, former state representative for the 35th district (running for state senate)Endorsements

Primary results

General election
Predictions

Results

District 6

The 6th district is located in east-central Indiana, taking in, Columbus, Richmond and the southern suburbs of Indianapolis; part is inside Interstate 465, which was previously in the 7th district. The incumbent is Republican Greg Pence, who was elected with 68.6% of the vote in 2020.

Republican primary
Candidates
Nominee
 Greg Pence, incumbent U.S. representative

Eliminated in primary
 James Alspach

Removed from ballot
 Zach Smith

Endorsements

Results

Democratic primary
Candidates
Nominee
 Cinde Wirth, teacher

Eliminated in primary
 George Holland

Removed from ballot
 Mark Powell

Endorsements

Results

General election
Predictions

Results

 District 7 

The 7th district is centered around Indianapolis. It has moved slightly north since the 2010-2020 cycle to include some parts of the previous 5th district in northern Indianapolis; some southern portions of Indianapolis have moved away from the 7th into the 6th. The incumbent is Democrat André Carson, who was re-elected with 62.4% of the vote in 2020.

Democratic primary
Candidates
Nominee
André Carson, incumbent U.S. representative

Eliminated in primary
Curtis Godfrey
Pierre Pullins

Endorsements

Results

Republican primary
Candidates
Nominee
Angela Grabovsky, financial advisor

Eliminated in primary
Bill Allen
Rusty Johnson
Jennifer Pace
Gerald Walters

Primary results

Libertarian convention
Candidates
Nominee
Gavin Maple

 General election 
 Predictions 

 Results 

 District 8 

The 8th district is based in southwestern and west central Indiana, and includes the cities of Evansville and Terre Haute. The incumbent is Republican Larry Bucshon, who was re-elected with 66.9% of the vote in 2020.

Republican primary
Candidates
Nominee
Larry Bucshon, incumbent U.S. representative

Endorsements

Results

Democratic primary
Candidates
Nominee
Ray McCormick, farmer and conservationist

Eliminated in primary
Adnan Dhahir
Peter Priest

Endorsements

Results

Libertarian convention
Candidates
Nominee
Andrew Horning, product manager

 General election 
 Predictions 

 Results 

 District 9 

The 9th district is based in southeast Indiana, and includes the cities of Bloomington and Jeffersonville, the latter of which is in the Louisville metropolitan area. The incumbent is Republican Trey Hollingsworth, who was re-elected with 61.8% of the vote in 2020.

Republican primary
Candidates
Nominee
Erin Houchin, former state senator (2014–2022)

Eliminated in primary
Jim Baker
Stu Barnes-Israel, U.S. Army veteran
J. Michael Davisson, state representative
Dan Heiwig, U.S. Army combat veteran
Eric Schansberg, economics professor at Indiana University Southeast and Libertarian nominee for this district in 2006 and 2008
Mike Sodrel, former U.S. representative for this district (2005–2007)
Bill Thomas
Brian Tibbs

Declined
Trey Hollingsworth, incumbent U.S. representative

Endorsements

Primary results

Democratic primary
Candidates
Nominee
Matthew Fyfe, teacher

Eliminated in primary
Isak Nti Asare, Indiana University faculty member
D. Liam Dorris, USMC veteran

Endorsements

Primary results

Libertarian convention
Candidates
Nominee
Tonya Millis, real estate broker

Green convention
Candidates
Nominee
Jacob Bailey (write-in)''

General election

Predictions

Endorsements

Results

Notes

References

External links
Official campaign websites for 1st district candidates
Jennifer-Ruth Green (R) for Congress
Frank J. Mrvan (D) for Congress

Official campaign websites for 2nd district candidates
Paul Steury (D) for Congress
Rudy Yakym (R) for Congress

Official campaign websites for 3rd district candidates
Jim Banks (R) for Congress 
Gary Snyder (D) for Congress

Official campaign websites for 4th district candidates
Jim Baird (R) for Congress

Official campaign websites for 5th district candidates
Jeanine Lee Lake (D) for Congress
Victoria Spartz (R) for Congress

Official campaign websites for 6th district candidates
Greg Pence (R) for Congress
Cinde Wirth (D) for Congress

Official campaign websites for 7th district candidates
André Carson (D) for Congress
Angela Grabovsky (R) for Congress	

Official campaign websites for 8th district candidates
Larry Bucshon (R) for Congress
Andrew Horning (L) for Congress
Ray McCormick (D) for Congress

Official campaign websites for 9th district candidates
Matthew Fyfe (D) for Congress
Erin Houchin (R) for Congress
Tonya Millis (L) for Congress

2022
Indiana
United States House of Representatives